Gaius Memmius (born c. 70 BC) was a Roman senator who was appointed suffect consul in 34 BC.

Biography
Gaius Memmius was the son of Gaius Memmius. His mother was Fausta Cornelia, thus making him a grandson of controversial Lucius Cornelius Sulla, the former dictator of Rome. A Novus homo, very little is known of his career, and it is unknown whether he was a supporter of Gaius Julius Caesar Octavianus or of Marcus Antonius. He was appointed consul suffectus in 34 BC, replacing Lucius Scribonius Libo. He was later appointed proconsular governor of Asia, sometime after 30 BC. During his tenure as governor, Memmius set up monument honoring himself and three generations of his family, which still survives today. The inscription reads:

which translates as:

Sources
 Broughton, T. Robert S., The Magistrates of the Roman Republic, Vol II (1952)
 Syme, Ronald, The Augustan Aristocracy (1986) Clarendon Press
 Mallios Yorgos, Ephesus (Antiquity), Monument of Memmius, Encyclopaedia of the Hellenic World, Asia Minor

References

Further reading 
 T.P. Wiseman, "Lucius Memmius and his Family", Classical Quarterly, 17 (1967), pp. 164–167.

1st-century BC Roman consuls
70s BC births
Year of birth uncertain
Year of death unknown
Senators of the Roman Empire
Roman governors of Asia
Memmii